S. terrestris may refer to:
 Scotiellopsis terrestris, an alga species
 Skvortzoviothrix terrestris, an alga species

See also
 Terrestris